HMS Otway (originally HMAS Otway) was an  of the Royal Australian Navy (RAN) and Royal Navy (RN).

Design and construction

The s were built to a slightly modified design for Australian service. Displacement was 1,350 tons when surfaced, and 1,870 tons when submerged. The boats had diesel motors for surface running and electricity generation, but when underwater ran off electric motors. They had two propeller shafts. Otway had a boat's company of 54. Armament consisted of eight  torpedo tubes (six facing forward, two facing aft), one  deck gun, and two machine guns.

Otway was laid down by Vickers Limited of Barrow-in-Furness in England in March 1925, under the designation OA2. She was launched on 7 September 1926, and commissioned into the RAN on 15 June 1927.

Operational history
After commissioning, Otway and Oxley were temporarily assigned to the Royal Navy's 5th Submarine Flotilla. On 8 February 1928, the two submarines set out for Australia in the longest unescorted voyage undertaken by a British submarine. En route to Malta, cracks were found on Otways engine columns. On arrival in Malta, similar fractures were found in Oxleys engine columns, and the two boats were detained while improved columns were fabricated and installed. They resumed their voyage in November, and reached Sydney on 14 February 1929. Because of the deteriorating financial conditions leading into the Great Depression, the two submarines were placed into reserve a year later; Otway was paid off on 10 May 1930. The submarines were maintained in operational condition, and left the harbour twice a month for diving exercises.

The ongoing cost of maintaining the boats, coupled with the tonnage limits imposed by the London Naval Treaty prompted the Australian government to offer Otway and Oxley to the Royal Navy. The submarines were transferred and commissioned on 10 April 1931, and sailed to Britain.

HMS Otway operated during World War II with the pennant number 51. In 1942 it was under the command of Commander Howard Bone.

The submarine left RN service in 1945, and in August was transported to Thos. W. Ward Inverkeithing, Scotland to be broken up.

Citations

References

External links
 

1926 ships
Ships built in Barrow-in-Furness
Odin-class submarines of the Royal Navy
World War II submarines of the United Kingdom